Raimona National Park is located in extreme western part of Assam, India. It is spread across Gossaigaon and Kokrajhar subdivisions of Kokrajhar district of BTR.

History

It was declared a National Park on 5 June 2021 by the announcement of Assam's Chief Minister Himanta Biswa Sarma on the occasion of World Environment Day at Gandhi Mandap, Guwahati. On 9 June 2021; it became as National Park through an Assam Gazette Notification no.FRW.02/2021/27 dtd. 8 June 2021. It is a part of a contiguous forest patch with an area of  covering the northern part of the notified Ripu Reserve Forest, which forms the westernmost buffer to Manas Tiger Reserve in the foothills of Eastern Himalaya Biodiversity Hotspot. The present Raimona National Park was originally recommended as Ripu-Chirang Wildlife Sanctuary being part of Ripu reserved forest and Chirang reserved forest being adjacent a part of it was also mooted to be within. Those were made owing to its significance for conservation of Asian elephants, gaur or Indian "bison" and golden langur, all of which have large populations in the area. It is also part of Chirang-Ripu Elephant Reserve.

Description
The boundary of Raimona National Park is marked by the Sankosh River on the west, along the inter-state boundary of West Bengal and Assam from Indo-Bhutan border up to fire line Ride-6 southwards (BP30) and Saralbhanga River on the east, runs northwards till it touches the Indo-Bhutan international boundary on the north and remaining part of Ripu Reserve Forest on the south. The southern boundary runs eastwards along the fire line Ride-6 up to Pekua River where it runs at 90 degrees southwards till it meets the fire line Ride-3.

Biodiversity

Raimona National Park is famous for golden langur, an endemic species (with Bhutan) which has been named as the mascot of Bodoland region. It also has Asian elephant, Bengal tiger, clouded leopard, gaur, chital, four to five species of hornbills, more than 150 species of butterflies, 190 species of birds, 380 varieties of plants and orchids. It is already on the global map for being an important bird and biodiversity area.

Wildlife

Fauna
Being a moist deciduous and semi-evergreen forest, this National Park is rich in biodiversity. It has four non-human primates, slow loris, Assamese macaque, Rhesus monkey and capped langur. Other noteworthy mammals found in this national park includes Chinese pangolin, dhole or Asian wild dog, Himalayan black bear, crab-eating mongoose, jungle cat, leopard cat, Asian golden cat, Bengal tiger, leopard, clouded leopard, Asian elephant, gaur, Himalayan serow, sambar, chital, hog deer, barking deer, crestless Himalayan porcupine and hispid hare.

Avifauna

Raimona forest harbours more than 260 bird species. Avifauna includes critically endangered white-bellied heron, swamp francolin, kaleej pheasant, grey peacock pheasant, Indian peafowl, Oriental darter, lesser adjutant, collared falconet, slender-billed vulture, white-backed vulture, besra, black baza, Jerdon's baza, osprey, Bengal florican, now perhaps extirpated, ibisbill, green imperial pigeon, mountain imperial pigeon, red-breasted parakeet, great pied hornbill, occasional rufous-necked and grey hornbills, wreathed hornbill, hill myna and scaly thrush.

References

National parks in Assam
Kokrajhar district